C. N. Muthuranga Mudaliar (c. 1888 - d. 2 February 1949) was an Indian politician and Indian independence activist who served as a member of the Central Legislative Assembly He was elected President of the Tamil Nadu Congress on 16 January 1938. Mudaliar was the paternal uncle of Indian politician, M. Bhaktavatsalam.

References

Sources
 
 

1880s births
1949 deaths
Indian independence activists from Tamil Nadu
Members of the Central Legislative Assembly of India
ta:முத்துரங்க முதலியார்